Justin Roczniak, also known through his YouTube alias donoteat01, is an American YouTuber and podcaster. He is known for his political commentary through the video game Cities: Skylines and as the co-host of podcast Well There's Your Problem.

Personal life
Roczniak is a structural engineer and lives in Philadelphia. He considers himself to be a socialist.

YouTube Career 
On his YouTube channel donoteat01, Roczniak uploads videos on Cities: Skylines, using the game to explain the politics and power behind the construction of American cities. In the videos, he constructs case studies of urban development, discussing topics like public housing, slum clearance, and parking minimums. His main YouTube series is Franklin, where he discusses the historical development of cities through the fictional city of Franklin. He co-hosts the Well There’s Your Problem podcast, which was initially an offshoot of his YouTube channel.

Although Roczniak initally intended for his videos to be historical, he has stated that it would not be possible to discuss history in an apolitical manner.

References

American YouTubers
American socialists
Living people
Year of birth missing (living people)
American structural engineers